Zang may refer to:

 Official abbreviation for Tibet Autonomous Region (藏)
 Tibetan people
 Zang (bell) Perisan musical instrument
 Zang (surname) (臧), a Chinese surname
 Zang, Iran, a village in Kerman Province, Iran
 Persian form of Zanj

See also
 Tsang (disambiguation)
 Zhang (disambiguation)